Sheykhlu or Shekhlow or Shekhlu may refer to various places in Iran:
 Sheykhlu, Ardabil
 Sheykhlu, East Azerbaijan
 Sheykhlu, Razavi Khorasan
 Sheykhlu, Zanjan

See also
 Sheykhlar (disambiguation), various places in Iran